Reginald le Chen may refer to:

 Reginald le Chen (d.1293), Chamberlain of Scotland
 Reginald le Chen (d.1312), Scottish noble
 Reginald le Chen (d.1345), Scottish noble